The Custos Rotulorum of County Galway was the highest civil officer in County Galway. The position was later combined with that of Lord Lieutenant of Galway.

Incumbents

 Richard de Burgh, 8th Earl of Clanricarde (Died after 1708)
1754-? Sir Thomas Prendergast, 2nd Baronet
1792–1797 Henry de Burgh, 1st Marquess of Clanricarde and 12th Earl
1798–1808 John de Burgh, 13th Earl of Clanricarde
?1808–?1837 Richard Trench, 2nd Earl of Clancarty (died 1837)

For later custodes rotulorum, see Lord Lieutenant of Galway

References

Galway